Olessya Kulakova (born January 31, 1977 in Almaty) is a Kazakhstani-German volleyball player. She played as a middle blocker for the German Women's National Team. 

Kulakova represented her adopted country at the 2004 Summer Olympics, finishing in ninth place, and at the 2002 FIVB Volleyball Women's World Championship in Germany. On the club level she played with Schweriner SC.

References

External links 
 Profile at sportsreference.com

German women's volleyball players
Volleyball players at the 2004 Summer Olympics
Olympic volleyball players of Germany
Sportspeople from Almaty
Kazakhstani women's volleyball players
Kazakhstani emigrants to Germany
1977 births
Living people